This is a list of notable people who attended, or taught at, the University of Wisconsin–Eau Claire in the United States.

Notable alumni

Music 
 Reid Anderson, bassist for the Bad Plus
 Michael Andrew, singer and bandleader
 Chris Bates, bassist
 S. Carey, percussionist
 Phil Cook, banjoist
 Anthony Cox, jazz bassist
 Greg Fedderly, operatic tenor
 Esther Heideman, operatic soprano
 Michael Jerling, folk musician
 Larry Lelli, drummer
 Peter Madsen, jazz pianist
 Pat Mallinger, saxophonist
 Lyle Mays, jazz pianist and member of the Pat Metheny Group
 Mark McKenzie, film composer
 Scott Pingel, bassist
 Matt Pivec, saxophonist
 Willy Porter, guitarist and singer
 Christopher Porterfield, leader of Field Report
 Janika Vandervelde, composer
 Justin Vernon, lead singer and founder of Bon Iver
 Glenn Worf, Nashville session bassist

Business and economics
 Claudia-Maria Buch, University of Tübingen economist; German Council of Economic Experts member
 Masami Imai, economist and professor
 Harry Kaiser, economist and Cornell University professor
 Michael Knetter, economist and administrator
 Mary Laschinger, CEO of Veritiv, Fortune 500 company
 Sona Mehring, founder of CaringBridge
 Charlie Menard, Menards executive
 John Menard Jr., founder of Menards
 Schuyler F. Otteson, former Kelley School of Business dean
 Horacio D. Rozanski, CEO of Booz Allen Hamilton
 Charles Szews, former CEO of Oshkosh Corporation, Fortune 500 company
 Robert Webb, professor of economics and business
 Bart Wilson, experimental economist

Science
 James Anderson, expert on biomaterials
 Michael Bicay, Director of Science at NASA Ames Research Center
 Duane F. Bruley, engineer
 T. Keith Glennan, first administrator at NASA
 Thomas Gordon Hartley, botanist
 David W. Hein, cancer prevention researcher
 Corey Keyes, psychologist
 William J. Klish, obesity researcher
 Charles Mace, behavioral psychologist
 Pamela Matson, MacArthur Fellow
 Gustavo R. Paz-Pujalt, scientist and inventor
 George R. Rossman, professor of mineralogy at Caltech
 Richard Saykally, chemist
 Victor Shoup, computer scientist

Government
 Tyler August, Wisconsin State Assembly
 Joseph H. Ball, U.S. Senator
 Kathy Bernier, Wisconsin State Assembly
 Reginald Bicha, Secretary of the Wisconsin Department of Children and Families
 Sheri Polster Chappell, United States federal judge
 Dennis B. Danielson, Wisconsin State Assembly
 Davis A. Donnelly, Wisconsin State Senate
 Keith Downey, Minnesota House of Representatives
 Mark Andrew Green, U.S. Congressman
 Dave Duax, Wisconsin Cabinet Secretary, Vice President of the Eau Claire City Council, and Chairman of the Eau Claire County Board.
 Connor Hansen, Wisconsin Supreme Court Justice
 Joan Heggen, first female mayor of Tallahassee, Florida
 Robert Jauch, Wisconsin State Assembly
 Raymond C. Johnson, Wisconsin State Senate Majority Leader
 Pat Kreitlow, Wisconsin State Senate
 Jacquelyn J. Lahn, Wisconsin State Assembly
 Robert J. Larson, Wisconsin State Assembly
 Thomas W. Meaux, Wisconsin State Assembly
 Ann Nischke, Wisconsin State Assembly
 Arthur L. Padrutt, Wisconsin State Senate
 Gregory A. Peterson, Wisconsin Court of Appeals Deputy Chief Judge
 Warren Petryk, Wisconsin State Assembly
 David Plombon, Wisconsin State Assembly
 Joe Plouff, Wisconsin State Assembly
 Mae Schunk, Lieutenant Governor of Minnesota
 Patricia Spafford Smith, Wisconsin State Assembly
 Lisa K. Stark, Wisconsin Court of Appeals Judge
 Scott Suder, Wisconsin State Assembly
 Tom Sykora, Wisconsin State Assembly
 Charles H. Thompson, Secretary of the Wisconsin Department of Transportation
 Lester P. Voigt, Wisconsin Department of Natural Resources
 Sarah Waukau, Wisconsin State Assembly
 Jeffrey Wood, Wisconsin State Assembly
 David Zien, Wisconsin State Senate
 Brad Zweck, Wisconsin State Assembly

Journalism
 Ray Anderson, New York Times journalist
 Ann Brill, Journalism Dean at the University of Kansas
 Ann Devroy, Washington Post journalist
 Bill Gavin, publisher
 Steven Hyden, music critic
 Stephen Koepp, executive editor of Fortune magazine
 David Paul Kuhn, political journalist
 Claire B. Lang, NASCAR radio host
 Robert D. McFadden, Pulitzer Prize winner

Arts and entertainment
 Sara Black, artist
 Sean Carey, musician
 Tony Duran, celebrity photographer
 Greg Gossel, artist
 Gary Griffin, theater director
David Jacobs, author
 R. Brandon Johnson, actor
 Christopher McKitterick, science fiction author and academic
 Debra Monroe, author
 Anne Elizabeth Moore, artist
 Alfredo Narciso, actor
 John Noltner, photographer
 Patrick Thomas O'Brien, stage and film actor
 Michael Perry, author and humorist
 Dan Peterman, installation artist
 Mark Proksch, comedian
 Laila Robins, stage and film actress
 Jeffrey Sippel, printmaker
 Andrew Swant, filmmaker
 Denise Sweet, former poet laureate of Wisconsin
 Richard Terrill, author
 Justin Vernon, musician
 Jacqueline West, author of young adult fiction
 Elizabeth Willis, poet
 Aaron Yonda, filmmaker
 Shuga Cain, contestant on RuPaul’s Drag Race Season 11

Athletics
 Roman Brumm, NFL player
 Ryan Brunt, curling athlete
 Kevin Fitzgerald, NFL player
 Alex Hicks, NHL player
 Paul Menard, NASCAR driver
 Mike Ratliff, NBA player
 Frank Schade, NBA player
 Lee Weigel, NFL player
 Reed Zuehlke, Olympic athlete

Other
 Lyall T. Beggs, Commander in Chief of the VFW
 Ruth Clusen, environmentalist and President of the League of Women Voters
 John C. Dernbach, environmentalist and lawyer
 Found Footage Festival founders Nick Prueher and Joe Pickett
 Leonard Haas, university administrator
 LaVahn Hoh, drama expert
 Richard C. Johnston, U.S. Air Force general
 Brian "Kato" Kaelin, witness in the O. J. Simpson trial
 Jon K. Kelk, U.S. National Guard general
 Jeanne Halgren Kilde, religious studies academic
 Scott D. Legwold, U.S. National Guard general
 Lori Ringhand, judicial expert
 Veda Wright Stone, civil rights activist
 Nancy Fugate Woods, nursing pioneer
 Jane Zuengler, linguist
 Sarah Harder, feminist and associate professor emerita of English at the University of Wisconsin–Eau Claire

Notable faculty
Glenn Caruso, coach
Bob Clotworthy, Olympic gold medalist and coach
Anthony de Souza, Director of the National Research Council
Mike Eaves, hockey coach
Max Garland, Wisconsin poet laureate
Rita Gross, feminist theologian
Joseph C. Hisrich, sociology professor and member of the Wisconsin State Assembly
Will Jennings, composer
Jim Lind, NFL assistant coach
Jon Loomis, poet and writer
Bob Nielson, coach
Osonye Tess Onwueme, Nigerian playwright
Gregory A. Peterson, Deputy Chief Judge of the Wisconsin Court of Appeals
Caroline Joan S. Picart, novelist, academic and philosopher
Lisa Stone, basketball coach
Veda Wright Stone, Native American rights activist
Kao Kalia Yang, Hmong author

Chancellors and Presidents
Since its founding in 1916, the University of Wisconsin–Eau Claire has had three presidents and six chancellors. One president, Leonard Haas, took an interim assignment with the UW System and returned as chancellor.

 Harvey Schofield, President 1916–1940
 William R. Davies, President 1941–1959
 Leonard Haas, President 1959–1971, Chancellor 1973–1980
 M. Emily Hannah, Chancellor 1981–1984
 Larry G. Schnack, Chancellor 1985–1997
 Donald J. Mash, Chancellor 1998–2005
 Brian Levin-Stankevich, Chancellor 2006–2012
 James Schmidt, Chancellor 2013–present

References

University of Wisconsin-Eau Claire people
University of Wisconsin–Eau Claire